The 1930 Wofford Terriers football team represented Wofford College as a member the Southern Intercollegiate Athletic Association (SIAA) during the 1930 college football season. Led by fourth-year head coach Tommy Scaffe, the Terriers compiled an overall record of 2–9, with a mark of 1–3 in conference play.

Schedule

References

Wofford
Wofford Terriers football seasons
Wofford Terriers football